Bénirail is the concessioned railway system of Benin.  It is being rehabilitated by the Bolloré Group.

The project includes complete replacement of the track and the rehabilitation of the stations at Cadjèhoun Saint-Jean, Godomey, Cococodji and Pahou.

A passenger service to be called Blueline using second hand coaches from Switzerland's Zentralbahn is due to start in late 2015. Bénirail will purchase BB204 diesel locomotive  and Nippon Sharyo coaches from Indonesia.

Suburban 
 Cotonou - economic capital
 Cadjehoun
 Saint-Jean
 Godomey
 Cococodji
 Pahou
 Sémé
 Stage 2
 Sémé
 Porto Novo - capital

Country 
 Cotonou
 Parakou (000 km)
 Niamey, Niger (574 km)

International 
A metre gauge network of 2500 km is proposed to link the following countries:
 Côte d’Ivoire
 Burkina Faso
 Niger
 Benin 
 Togo

See also 
 Railway stations in Benin
 Suburban railways in Africa

References 

Rail transport in Benin